Dame Judith Sarah Farbey (born 12 October 1965) is a British High Court judge. 

Farbey was born in London and attended university at Magdalen College, Oxford, completing a BA in 1989. After her undergraduate studies, she completed a graduate diploma in law at City University in 1991. 

Following her time at City, she was called to the bar at Middle Temple in 1992, practising from Doughty Street Chambers. She took silk in 2011 and served deputy judge of the Upper Tribunal (Administrative Appeals Chamber) from 2014 to 2018 and served as a recorder from 2016 to 2018. She was a member of the Bar Standards Board from 2016 to 2018. In addition to practice, she jointly authored Law of Habeas Corpus in 2011. 

On 1 October 2018, Farbey was appointed a judge of the High Court and assigned to the Queen's Bench Division. She received the customary damehood in the same year. Since 2019, she has been President of the Upper Tribunal (Administrative Appeals Chamber).

In 2011, she married Prabhat Vaze.

References 

Living people
1965 births
British women judges
Dames Commander of the Order of the British Empire
Alumni of Magdalen College, Oxford
Alumni of City, University of London
Members of the Inner Temple
21st-century King's Counsel
English King's Counsel
21st-century English judges